Kenneth H. Walker (17 October 1919 – 25 July 2013) was an Australian rules footballer who played with St Kilda in the Victorian Football League (VFL).

Walker, a key position player, played 109 games for St Kilda, from 1938 to 1945. He won St Kilda's Best and fairest award back to back in 1942 and 1943. 

He was playing coach of Burnie in 1946, then coached Launceston to three successive grand finals, which were all lost to rival North Launceston. 

In 1950 and 1951, Walker was captain-coach of Benalla.

Walker was later elected as the inaugural President of the Benalla Junior Football League in 1953.

For many years, Walker was part of the ground staff at the Moorabbin Oval.

References

Links
 1950 - Benalla FC team photo

1919 births
2013 deaths
Australian rules footballers from Bendigo
Trevor Barker Award winners
St Kilda Football Club players
Burnie Football Club players
Preston Football Club (VFA) players
Benalla Football Club players
Launceston Football Club players
Launceston Football Club coaches